Dupire is a surname. Notable people with the surname include:

Anne Dupire (1902–?), French swimmer and Olympian
Bruno Dupire (born 1958), French researcher and lecturer in quantitative finance
Marguerite Dupire (1920–2015), French ethnologist 
Serge Dupire (born 1958), Canadian actor